Phosphorus pentoxide is a chemical compound with molecular formula P4O10 (with its common name derived from its empirical formula, P2O5). This white crystalline solid is the anhydride of phosphoric acid. It is a powerful desiccant and dehydrating agent.

Structure
Phosphorus pentoxide crystallizes in at least four forms or polymorphs. The most familiar one, a metastable form (shown in the figure), comprises molecules of P4O10. Weak van der Waals forces hold these molecules together in a hexagonal lattice (However, in spite of the high symmetry of the molecules, the crystal packing is not a close packing). The structure of the P4O10 cage is reminiscent of adamantane with Td symmetry point group. It is closely related to the corresponding anhydride of phosphorous acid, P4O6. The latter lacks terminal oxo groups. Its density is 2.30 g/cm3. It boils at 423 °C under atmospheric pressure; if heated more rapidly it can sublimate. This form can be made by condensing the vapor of phosphorus pentoxide rapidly, and the result is an extremely hygroscopic solid.

The other polymorphs are polymeric, but in each case the phosphorus atoms are bound by a tetrahedron of oxygen atoms, one of which forms a terminal P=O bond involving the donation of the terminal oxygen p-orbital electrons to the antibonding phosphorus-oxygen single bonds. The macromolecular form can be made by heating the compound in a sealed tube for several hours, and maintaining the melt at a high temperature before cooling the melt to the solid. The metastable orthorhombic "O"-form (density 2.72 g/cm3, melting point 562 °C) adopts a layered structure consisting of interconnected P6O6 rings, not unlike the structure adopted by certain polysilicates. The stable form is a higher density phase, also orthorhombic, the so-called O' form. It consists of a 3-dimensional framework, density 3.5 g/cm3. The remaining polymorph is a glass or amorphous form; it can be made by fusing any of the others.

Preparation
P4O10 is prepared by burning white phosphorus with a sufficient supply of oxygen: 

 P4 + 5 O2 → P4O10

The dehydration of phosphoric acid to give phosphorus pentoxide is not possible, as on heating it forms various polyphosphates but will not dehydrate sufficiently to form P4O10.

Applications
Phosphorus pentoxide is a potent dehydrating agent as indicated by the exothermic nature of its hydrolysis producing phosphoric acid:  
P4O10 + 6 H2O → 4 H3PO4   (–177 kJ)

However, its utility for drying is limited somewhat by its tendency to form a protective viscous coating that inhibits further dehydration by unspent material. A granular form of P4O10 is used in desiccators.

Consistent with its strong desiccating power, P4O10 is used in organic synthesis for dehydration. The most important application is for the conversion of primary amides into nitriles:
P4O10 + RC(O)NH2 → P4O9(OH)2 + RCN
The indicated coproduct P4O9(OH)2 is an idealized formula for undefined products resulting from the hydration of P4O10.

Alternatively, when combined with a carboxylic acid, the result is the corresponding anhydride:
P4O10 + RCO2H → P4O9(OH)2 + [RC(O)]2O

The "Onodera reagent", a solution of P4O10 in DMSO, is employed for the oxidation of alcohols. This reaction is reminiscent of the Swern oxidation.

The desiccating power of P4O10 is strong enough to convert many mineral acids to their anhydrides. Examples: HNO3 is converted to N2O5;  H2SO4 is converted to SO3;  HClO4 is converted to Cl2O7;  CF3SO3H is converted to (CF3)2S2O5.

As a proxy measurement 
 content is often used by industry as proxy value for all the phosphorus oxides in a material. For example, fertilizer grade phosphoric acid can also contain various related phosphorous compounds which are also of use. All these compounds are described collectively in terms of ' content' to allow convenient comparison of the phosphorous content of different products. Despite this, phosphorus pentoxide is not actually present in most samples as it is not stable in aqueous solutions.

Related phosphorus oxides
Between the commercially important P4O6 and P4O10, phosphorus oxides are known with intermediate structures.

On observation it will be seen that double bonded oxygen in P4O8 at 1,2 position or 1,3 position are identical and both positions have same steric hindrance. Cycle 12341 and ABCDA are identical.

Hazards
Phosphorus pentoxide itself is not flammable. Just like sulfur trioxide, it reacts vigorously with water and water-containing substances like wood or cotton, liberates much heat and may even cause fire due to the highly exothermic nature of such reactions. It is corrosive to metal and is very irritating – it may cause severe burns to the eye, skin, mucous membrane, and respiratory tract even at concentrations as low as 1 mg/m3.

See also
Eaton's reagent

References

External links

Inorganic phosphorus compounds
Acid anhydrides
Acidic oxides
Glass compositions
Dehydrating agents
Adamantane-like molecules
Phosphorus oxides
Phosphorus(V) compounds
Deliquescent substances